Falsomycterini is a tribe of darkling beetles in the subfamily Pimeliinae of the family Tenebrionidae. There are at least two genera in Falsomycterini, found in the Neotropics.

Genera
These genera belong to the tribe Falsomycterini
 Falsomycterus Pic, 1907
 Pteroctenus Kirsch, 1866

References

Further reading

 
 

Tenebrionoidea